Old Martin was a large grizzly bear given in 1811, when already full-sized, to George III by the Hudson's Bay Company. The bear was sent to the Royal Menagerie, housed at the Tower of London. Although this was the first grizzly bear in England, the king said he would rather have had been given a new tie or a pair of socks. The Royal Menagerie was closed in 1831 or 1832 by the Duke of Wellington, the governor of the Tower. The bear and other animals were moved to the new London Zoo in Regent's Park –  Old Martin died there in 1838.

Writing in 1829 the zoologist Edward Turner Bennett said as a conclusion to his chapter on grizzly bears:

During Old Martin's stay at the Tower, in 1816, a Yeomen Warder on night duty saw a ghostly bear near the Martin Tower and, terrified, he struck at it with his bayonet only to find it went right through the vision and stuck into the door behind. It was said the guard died of shock a few hours afterwards. Old Martin was not the first bear to have lived at the Tower of London because in 1251 Henry III had been given a polar bear by the king of Norway, Haakon the Young. 

In 1999 Old Martin's skin and feet were found at the Natural History Museum, London, catalogued as a "black bear", and were returned to the Tower for a special exhibition.

See also
 List of individual bears

Further reading

References

Tower of London
Individual bears
Grizzly bears
London Zoo
English ghosts
1838 animal deaths
Individual animals in England